Aechmea fosteriana, the lacquered wine cup, is a bromeliad native to Brazil, which is endemic to coastal areas of the State of Espírito Santo. This plant is often grown as an ornamental plant.

The following subspecies are recognized :
Aechmea fosteriana subsp. fosteriana  L.B.Sm., 1941
Aechmea fosteriana subsp. rupicola Leme, 1987

Cultivars
 Aechmea 'Bert'
 Aechmea 'Chantifost'
 Aechmea 'Foster's Chant'
 Aechmea 'Kimberley'
 Aechmea 'Little Bert'
 × Canmea 'Majo'

References

External links
Aechmea fosteriana photo

fosteriana
Flora of Brazil
Plants described in 1941